Graham William Johnson (born 8 November 1946) is a former English cricketer and business executive. He played for Kent County Cricket Club between 1965 and 1985 and was later the chairman of the club's Cricket Committee. He was born in Beckenham in 1946.

Johnson made his first-class cricket debut in 1965 and won his county cap in 1970. He was a versatile batsman and off-spin bowler who featured in a strong Kent team which won four County Championships and a number of limited overs trophies during his time with the club. He was vice-captain of the Kent side under Mike Denness.

A graduate of the London School of Economics, Johnson had a successful business career with Barclays Bank, Save and Prosper, Flemings, Egg and Prudential. He has been a director of TAL Talent Ltd, a specialist search, recruitment, assessment and people development company.

Johnson has also been active with the Lord's Taverners both on its Cricket Committee and as a player. He succeeded Denness as Chairman of the Kent Cricket Committee in 2004 and served as Kent President in 2014.

References

External links
 

1946 births
Living people
Alumni of the London School of Economics
Cricketers from Beckenham
D. H. Robins' XI cricketers
English cricketers
Gauteng cricketers
Kent cricketers
Marylebone Cricket Club cricketers
Presidents of Kent County Cricket Club
T. N. Pearce's XI cricketers
Marylebone Cricket Club Touring Team cricketers